Bray Meadows is a  biological Site of Special Scientific Interest in Maidenhead in Berkshire.

These unimproved meadows adjacent to a side channel of the River Thames have a rich diversity of flora. River bank plants include the nationally scarce parasitic greater dodder. There are typical damp meadow plants such as meadow barley, lesser stitchwort and meadowsweet, while one of the fields has many ant hills.

The site is private land with no public access.

References

Sites of Special Scientific Interest in Berkshire